The Girl from Gay Paree is a 1927 silent film directed by Phil Goldstone and Arthur Gregor and starring Lowell Sherman and Barbara Bedford. It was produced and released by Tiffany Pictures. It is preserved at the BFI National Archive.

Cast
Lowell Sherman - Robert Ryan
Barbara Bedford - Mary Davis
Malcolm McGregor - Kenneth Ward
Betty Blythe - Mademoiselle Fanchon
Walter Hiers - Sam
Margaret Livingston - Gertie
Templar Saxe - Wayne
Leo White - Monsieur Logier

References

External links

1927 films
American silent feature films
Tiffany Pictures films
American black-and-white films
Films directed by Phil Goldstone
1920s English-language films
1920s American films